Pryke is a surname. Notable people with the surname include:

Anne Pryke, Jersey politician
Clement Pryke, English-American physicist
Paula Pryke (born 1960), British florist and author
Richard Pryke, British sound engineer
Roger Pryke. Reforming priest, social activist, civil servant
Sarah Pryke, behavioral and evolutionary ecologist

See also
Pryke baronets